Mireille Cébeillac-Gervasoni (7 April 1942 – 29 March 2017) was a French director of research at the CNRS in Paris. She was a specialist of Latin epigraphy and Republican and Imperial Roman history who published numerous research on the ruling local elites of the Roman Republic and early Roman Empire. She also devoted much time on the history and epigraphy of Ostia Antica.

She conducted archaeological excavations at Megara Hyblaea (Sicily).

Bibliography 
See her detailed bibliography on the site of the ANHIMA.

Scientific works 
Les quaestores principis et candidati aux Ie–IIe de l’Empire, Milan, 1973. 
 Les magistrats des cités italiennes de la seconde guerre punique à Auguste. Le Latium et la Campanie, Rome, 1998, BEFAR 299.

Direction d'ouvrages   
 Les élites de l’Italie péninsulaire des Gracques à Néron, Naples-Rome, 1996. 
 Les élites de l’Italie péninsulaire de la mort de César à la mort de Domitien entre rupture et continuité. Classes sociales dirigeantes et pouvoir central, Actes du Colloque de Naples 6-8 février 1997, Collection de l’EFR 271, Rome, 2000. 
 in collaboration with Laurent Lamoine and Frédéric Trément, Les élites et leurs facettes. Les élites locales dans le monde hellénistique et romain, Actes du colloque international de Clermont-Ferrand, 24-26 novembre 2000, Collection ERGA n° 3 de PUPB en coédition with the École Française de Rome : Collection de l'EFR 309, Rome-Clermont-Ferrand, 2003. 
 in collaboration with Laurent Lamoine and Frédéric Trément, Autocélébration des élites locales dans le monde romain : contextes, images, textes (IIe s. av. J.-C. / IIIe s. ap. J.-C.), Actes du colloquee international des 21-23 novembre 2004, Clermont-Ferrand, Collection ERGA, 2004. 
 in collaboration with Clara Berrendonner and Laurent Lamoine, Le quotidien municipal dans l'Occident romain, Presses universitaires Blaise-Pascal, Clermont-Ferrand, 2009.

University textbooks 
 in collaboration with J.-P. Martin and A. Chauvot, Histoire romaine, Collection « U », Armand Colin, Paris, 2001, 2003.
 in collaboration with Maria Letizia Caldelli and Fausto Zevi, Épigraphie latine, Armand Colin, Paris, 2006, .

Selection of articles 
 « Octavie, épouse de Gamala, et la Bona Dea », MEFRA, 1973, 85–2, p. 517-553 Read online.
 en collaboration avec Fausto Zevi, « Révision et nouveautés pour trois inscriptions d'Ostie », MEFRA, 1976, 88–2, p. 607-637 Read online.
 « L'évergétisme des magistrats du Latium et de la Campanie des Gracques à Auguste à travers les témoignages épigraphiques », MEFRA, 1990, 102–2, p. 699-722 Read online

References

External links 
 Mireille Cébeillac-Gervasoni on data.bnf.fr
 Les élites et leurs facettes. Les élites locales dans le monde hellénistique et romain on Persée
 Mireille Cébeillac-Gervasoni on thèses.fr

20th-century French historians
French women historians
21st-century French historians
French scholars of Roman history
Women classical scholars
French epigraphers
1942 births
2017 deaths
20th-century French women
21st-century French women
Research directors of the French National Centre for Scientific Research